Marcel Stutter (born 6 March 1988) is a German professional footballer who plays as a midfielder for BFC Dynamo in the Regionalliga Nordost. He played two seasons for NEC in the Eredivisie.

References

External links
 Voetbal International profile 

1988 births
Living people
People from Kamen
Sportspeople from Arnsberg (region)
German footballers
Footballers from North Rhine-Westphalia
Association football midfielders
Regionalliga players
Eredivisie players
Rot Weiss Ahlen players
FC Gütersloh 2000 players
NEC Nijmegen players
Berliner FC Dynamo players
German expatriate footballers
German expatriate sportspeople in the Netherlands
Expatriate footballers in the Netherlands